The giant Canada goose (Branta canadensis maxima) is the largest subspecies of Canada goose, on average weighing in at 5 kg (11 pounds). It is found in central North America. These geese were at one point considered extinct, but were later rediscovered.

Description
The giant Canada goose is often mistaken for the Moffitt's Canada goose. However, giant geese have both a lower call and a larger bill to body size ratio. Another good identifier includes the black on the neck, which starts much farther up the neck than any other subspecies. The giant goose's white cheek patch is very large, reaching the lower bill. Unlike other variants, the underbelly is very pale. A less reliable identifier is the white forehead and eyebrows, which don't always occur and Moffitt's geese less commonly have.

Taxonomy
The giant Canada goose is occasionally classified with the Moffitt's Canada goose, forming a singular subspecies. It is also, alongside the dusky Canada goose, the closest relative to the Hawaiian goose.

Recovery
In the 1950s, the giant Canada goose was declared extinct. However, a small population in Rochester, Minnesota was rediscovered by biologists in 1962. In recent years, the subspecies' numbers have been increasing and can commonly be found in parks and other urban areas. It is also thought that introduced populations of Canada geese in Europe are derived from B. c. maxima in addition to the nominate subspecies canadensis.

References

External links 
Giant Canada goose (Branta canadensis maxima)
Giant Canada Goose, Branta canadensis maxima, in Arizona
Distinguishing Cackling and Canada Goose

Branta
Geese
Native birds of the Plains-Midwest (United States)